Eagleswood Township is a township in Ocean County, in the U.S. state of New Jersey. As of the 2020 United States census, the township's population was 1,722, an increase of 119 (+7.4%) from the 2010 census count of 1,603, which in turn reflected an increase of 162 (+11.2%) from the 1,441 counted in the 2000 census. The 2010 population was the highest recorded in any decennial census.

Eagleswood Township was incorporated as a township by an act of the New Jersey Legislature on March 17, 1874, from portions of Stafford Township. Portions of the township were taken to form Beach Haven (November 11, 1890) and Long Beach Township (March 23, 1899).

Geography
According to the United States Census Bureau, the township had a total area of 18.96 square miles (49.11 km2), including 16.10 square miles (41.71 km2) of land and 2.86 square miles (7.41 km2) of water (15.08%).

Unincorporated communities, localities and place names located partially or completely within the township include Coxs, Cox's Crossing, Coxstown, Dinner Point, Horse Point, Mud Cove, Parker Cove, Spraguetown, Stafford Forge, Staffordville and West Creek.

The township borders the Ocean County municipalities of Little Egg Harbor Township, Long Beach Township and Stafford Township.

Demographics

2010 census

The Census Bureau's 2006–2010 American Community Survey showed that (in 2010 inflation-adjusted dollars) median household income was $60,221 (with a margin of error of +/− $4,757) and the median family income was $70,313 (+/− $11,006). Males had a median income of $49,875 (+/− $7,215) versus $38,036 (+/− $8,952) for females. The per capita income for the borough was $28,135 (+/− $2,836). About 4.8% of families and 6.2% of the population were below the poverty line, including 5.5% of those under age 18 and 1.4% of those age 65 or over.

2000 census
As of the 2000 United States census there were 1,441 people, 546 households, and 394 families residing in the township. The racial makeup of the township was 98.96% White, 0.07% African American, 0.28% Native American, 0.21% Asian, and 0.49% from two or more races. Hispanic or Latino of any race were 1.11% of the population.

There were 546 households, out of which 32.2% had children under the age of 18 living with them, 60.3% were married couples living together, 8.1% had a female householder with no husband present, and 27.7% were non-families. 22.3% of all households were made up of individuals, and 10.6% had someone living alone who was 65 years of age or older. The average household size was 2.64 and the average family size was 3.11.

In the township the population was spread out, with 24.7% under the age of 18, 6.7% from 18 to 24, 29.5% from 25 to 44, 24.7% from 45 to 64, and 14.4% who were 65 years of age or older. The median age was 39 years. For every 100 females, there were 101.5 males. For every 100 females age 18 and over, there were 100.2 males.

The median income for a household in the township was $38,625, and the median income for a family was $49,453. Males had a median income of $36,375 versus $26,654 for females. The per capita income for the township was $20,617. About 2.2% of families and 3.5% of the population were below the poverty line, including 3.2% of those under age 18 and 5.7% of those age 65 or over.

Government

Local government
Eagleswood Township is governed under the Township form of New Jersey municipal government, one of 141 (of the 564) municipalities statewide that use this form, the second-most commonly used form of government in the state. The governing body is a three-member Township Committee, whose members are elected directly by the voters at-large in partisan elections to serve three-year terms of office on a staggered basis, with one seat coming up for election each year as part of the November general election in a three-year cycle. At an annual reorganization meeting, the Township Committee selects one of its members to serve as Mayor and another as Deputy Mayor.

, members of the Eagleswood Township Committee are Mayor Michael J. Pasternak (R, term on committee and as mayor ends December 31, 2022), Deputy Mayor Nicholas A. Sommaripa (R, term on committee ends 2023; term as deputy mayor ends 2022) and Debra A. Rivas (R, 2024).

Emergency services
Eagleswood Township is served by Great Bay Regional Volunteer EMS, which also provides primary 911 emergency medical services for the residents of Little Egg Harbor Township and Bass River Township.

Since Eagleswood Township does not maintain its own police department, police services are provided by troopers from the New Jersey State Police Troop C, which maintains a barrack within the township.

Federal, state and county representation 
Eagleswood Township is located in the 2nd Congressional District and is part of New Jersey's 9th state legislative district.

 

Ocean County is governed by a Board of County Commissioners comprised of five members who are elected on an at-large basis in partisan elections and serving staggered three-year terms of office, with either one or two seats coming up for election each year as part of the November general election. At an annual reorganization held in the beginning of January, the board chooses a Director and a Deputy Director from among its members. , Ocean County's Commissioners (with party affiliation, term-end year and residence) are:

Commissioner Director John P. Kelly (R, 2022, Eagleswood Township),
Commissioner Deputy Director Virginia E. Haines (R, 2022, Toms River),
Barbara Jo Crea (R, 2024, Little Egg Harbor Township)
Gary Quinn (R, 2024, Lacey Township) and
Joseph H. Vicari (R, 2023, Toms River). Constitutional officers elected on a countywide basis are 
County Clerk Scott M. Colabella (R, 2025, Barnegat Light),
Sheriff Michael G. Mastronardy (R, 2022; Toms River) and
Surrogate Jeffrey Moran (R, 2023, Beachwood).

Politics
As of March 2011, there were a total of 1,115 registered voters in Eagleswood Township, of which 165 (14.8%) were registered as Democrats, 466 (41.8%) were registered as Republicans and 482 (43.2%) were registered as Unaffiliated. There were 2 voters registered as Libertarians or Greens. Among the township's 2010 Census population, 69.6% (vs. 63.2% in Ocean County) were registered to vote, including 88.8% of those ages 18 and over (vs. 82.6% countywide).

In the 2012 presidential election, Republican Mitt Romney received 61.7% of the vote (455 cast), ahead of Democrat Barack Obama with 37.1% (274 votes), and other candidates with 1.2% (9 votes), among the 742 ballots cast by the township's 1,180 registered voters (4 ballots were spoiled), for a turnout of 62.9%. In the 2008 presidential election, Republican John McCain received 58.8% of the vote (473 cast), ahead of Democrat Barack Obama with 38.7% (311 votes) and other candidates with 0.9% (7 votes), among the 804 ballots cast by the township's 1,169 registered voters, for a turnout of 68.8%. In the 2004 presidential election, Republican George W. Bush received 62.6% of the vote (456 ballots cast), outpolling Democrat John Kerry with 35.8% (261 votes) and other candidates with 0.8% (8 votes), among the 729 ballots cast by the township's 997 registered voters, for a turnout percentage of 73.1.

In the 2013 gubernatorial election, Republican Chris Christie received 72.6% of the vote (345 cast), ahead of Democrat Barbara Buono with 24.4% (116 votes), and other candidates with 2.9% (14 votes), among the 482 ballots cast by the township's 1,144 registered voters (7 ballots were spoiled), for a turnout of 42.1%. In the 2009 gubernatorial election, Republican Chris Christie received 62.1% of the vote (351 ballots cast), ahead of  Democrat Jon Corzine with 26.4% (149 votes), Independent Chris Daggett with 6.5% (37 votes) and other candidates with 2.3% (13 votes), among the 565 ballots cast by the township's 1,154 registered voters, yielding a 49.0% turnout.

Education 
The Eagleswood Township School District serves students in public school for grades pre-kindergarten through sixth grade at Eagleswood Township Elementary School. As of the 2018–19 school year, the district, comprised of one school, had an enrollment of 134 students and 16.6 classroom teachers (on an FTE basis), for a student–teacher ratio of 8.1:1. In the 2016–17 school year, Eagleswood had the 20th smallest enrollment of any school district in the state, with 141 students.

Public school students in seventh through twelfth grades attend the schools of the Pinelands Regional School District, which also serves students from Bass River Township, Little Egg Harbor Township and Tuckerton Borough. Schools in the district (with 2018–19 enrollment data from the National Center for Education Statistics) are 
Pinelands Regional Junior High School with 811 students in grades 7–9 and 
Pinelands Regional High School with 744 students in grades 10–12. The district's board of education includes nine members directly elected by the residents of the constituent municipalities to three-year terms on a staggered basis, with three seats up for election each year. Eagleswood Township is allocated one of the nine seats.

Transportation

Roads and highways

The Garden State Parkway is the most prominent road passing through Eagleswood Township. However, there are no exits within the township, with the nearest access points being at Interchange 58 (County Route 539) in Little Egg Harbor Township and Interchange 63 (New Jersey Route 72) in Stafford Township. U.S. Route 9 is the main highway directly serving Eagleswood.

Public transportation
NJ Transit offers local bus service between the township and Atlantic City on the 559 route.

Ocean Ride local service is offered on route OC6.

Notable people

People who were born in, residents of, or otherwise closely associated with Eagleswood Township include:

 John T. Hendrickson Jr. (1923–1999), politician who represented the 9th Legislative District in the New Jersey General Assembly from 1982 to 1989
 George Inness (1825–1894), landscape painter
 Paul Marshall Johnson Jr. (1955–2004), helicopter engineer who was taken hostage by militants in 2004 and had his murder in Saudi Arabia by Al-Qaeda in the Arabian Peninsula recorded on video tape

References

External links

Official website

 
1874 establishments in New Jersey
Populated places in the Pine Barrens (New Jersey)
Populated places established in 1874
Township form of New Jersey government
Townships in Ocean County, New Jersey